Glasgow Royal Concert Hall is a concert and arts venue located in Glasgow, Scotland. It is owned by Glasgow City Council and operated by Glasgow Life, an agency of Glasgow City Council, which also runs Glasgow's City Halls and Old Fruitmarket venue.

History

Built as the Glasgow International Concert Hall, the Royal Concert Hall is one of the largest halls in the United Kingdom. It was granted Royal status shortly before it was officially opened on 5 October 1990 at a gala performance attended by HRH Princess Anne.

It is the  replacement for the acclaimed St. Andrew's Hall, adjacent to the Mitchell Library, which had been destroyed by fire in 1962, and was promoted and constructed in time for the city being recognised in the 1980s as the European City of Culture. The Concert Hall stands at the junction of Buchanan Street and Sauchiehall Street with a performers` entrance in West Nile Street, and public entrances in Buchanan street and in Killermont Street,  with the RSNO Centre added in later years. The development also anticipated the adjacent major shopping mall, which opened as the  Buchanan Galleries a decade later. The auditorium area is insulated by a massive rubber membrane built into the floor -  damping out noise and vibration from the Subway tracks which run underneath.

The Glasgow International Concert Hall was officially opened on 5 October 1990, by Her Royal Highness The Princess Royal. The Royal Scottish National Orchestra (then the Scottish National Orchestra) gave the very first performance at the Royal Gala Opening Concert, as a showpiece for Glasgow being awarded the European City of Culture. The programme featured two new works by Scottish composers, Carillon by Thomas Wilson and Rainbow 90 by Thea Musgrave, both specially commissioned for the occasion by Glasgow City Council, as well as pieces by Beethoven and Vaughan Williams. On the day prior, public concerts were given by the Band of Her Majesty's Royal Marines, with proceeds being donated to the RNLI, which also demonstrated how the stage and the floor levels can be changed to suit performances. The first non-classical concert was by The Blue Nile. The hall has been granted Royal Status and renamed Glasgow Royal Concert Hall.

Architecture
The building was designed by modernist architect Sir Leslie Martin of South Bank, London, with the Edinburgh-based company RMJM and partners as project architects in 1988.

Performance spaces and facilities
The Main Auditorium is the largest performance space in the Glasgow Royal Concert Hall, and can seat 2475 people. Other spaces in the hall include the 500 capacity Strathclyde Suite, the 300 capacity Exhibition Hall, the 120 capacity Buchanan Suite, the 300 capacity Lomond and Clyde foyers, the 100 capacity Strathclyde Bar, 150 capacity City of Music Studio and the 40 capacity VIP Room. The hall also has a gift shop, five bars and café. It also houses the headquarters of the Royal Scottish National Orchestra.

The Green Room, formerly a fine-dining room, was restyled in 2009 and renamed "The City of Music Studio" to celebrate Glasgow's UNESCO City of Music status. The City of Music Studio is known for the view overlooking Buchanan Street and its late night jazz programme. The Cafe Bar was re-branded and refurbished in 2011 as Café Encore following Encore's takeover of the catering department.

The Royal Scottish National Orchestra recently moved to a purpose-built new home on-site, entered from Killermont Street. At the heart of their new home is an acoustically adjustable, 600-seat auditorium, providing also world-class rehearsal and recording facilities for the Orchestra. The Royal Scottish National Orchestra Centre also houses a dedicated education space, the Robertson Learning and Engagement Centre.

A bespoke four manual Copeman Hart digital organ and associated speakers was permanently installed in the Hall in July 2015.

Notable events
The Hall is the Glasgow performance base of the Royal Scottish National Orchestra and has hosted many international orchestras, soloists and conductors, including the Royal Concertgebouw Orchestra, the St. Petersburg Philharmonic Orchestra, the National Youth Orchestras of Britain and Scotland, the Jazz at Lincoln Center Orchestra, Celia Bartoli, Julian Lloyd Webber and Maxim Vengerov.

As well as classical music, the hall plays host to opera and ballet, musical theatre, talks, rock and pop, folk, world and country, swing and comedy. It also exhibits art and photographic exhibitions, and is the venue for graduation ceremonies for the adjacent Glasgow Caledonian University.

On Sunday 9 October 1993 Nelson Mandela chose Glasgow as the place to formally receive the first of his freedoms of nine British cities. He entered the Hall to a choral rendition of Down by the Riverside and received a standing ovation. In 1994  Bob Hope took to the stage to commemorate the 50th anniversary of the D-Day landings.

The Hall is the main venue for the annual Celtic Connections Festival, and is one of the venues for the city's Aye Write Book Festival.

See also
List of concert halls

References

External links

Culture in Glasgow
Tourist attractions in Glasgow
Music venues in Glasgow
Concert halls in Scotland